Floating University may refer to:

Flying University, Uniwersytet Latający, sometimes also translated "Floating University"
Oceanic II (ship), an ocean liner being refitted for use as ocean-going educational vessel